Wu Chi-wai, MH (born 18 October 1962) is a Hong Kong politician. He is the former chairman of the Democratic Party from 2016 to 2020 and a former member of the Legislative Council of Hong Kong for Kowloon East constituency since 2012. He has also been a member of Wong Tai Sin District Council since 1999 and member of the Urban Council from 1995 to 1999.

Education and early career
Wu was born in Hong Kong in 1962 to a grassroots family who had been living in the squatter areas of Kowloon Walled City, Shun Lee Estate, and Wong Tai Sin. He was educated at the Queen's College, Hong Kong and went into social work after he graduated in 1981. He furthered his education at the University of Wisconsin–Milwaukee and obtained a master's degree in Economics in 1991. Subsequently, Wu returned to Hong Kong and worked as an assistant for Legislative Councillor Conrad Lam, who was a member of the pro-democracy party United Democrats of Hong Kong, which later transformed into the Democratic Party in 1994.

Urban and District Councillor
In the 1994 District Board election, Wu represented the Democratic Party who ran in the Upper Wong Tai Sin Estate but was defeated by Lam Man-fai of the pro-Beijing Democratic Alliance for the Betterment of Hong Kong (DAB) by a narrow margin of 94 votes. He subsequently got elected in the 1995 Urban Council election, beating veteran Urban Councillor Cecilia Yeung in Choi Hung Wan and Ngau Chi Wan and becoming among the last members of the Urban Council before it was abolished in 1999.

Wu has been member of the Wong Tai Sin District Council since he won in the King Fu constituency in the 1999 District Council elections. In the 2003 District Council elections, he grabbed in total of 4,480 votes in his King Fu constituency, only second to Leung Yiu-chung in Kwai Fong. In the 2007 elections, he was returned with the highest votes in the election and was called the "King of Votes".  He stepped down from the District Council in the 2019, and his party's candidate Rosanda Mok then retained the seat.

Legislative Councillor and Democratic Party chairman
Wu first sought a Legislative Council seat in 1998, when he contested the Sports, Performing Arts, Culture and Publication functional constituency, but lost to pro-establishment candidate Timothy Fok. He was on the Democratic Party ticket in Kowloon East in 2000 and 2004, taking the second or third place behind Szeto Wah and Fred Li. In the 2008 Legislative Council election, he ran his own ticket in Kowloon East next to Fred Li. Although Li was elected, Wu received the lowest votes of 16,365 and could not win a seat.

In 2012, Wu became the Democratic Party's candidate in Kowloon East after Fred Li announced his retirement from the Legislative Council. He received 43,764 votes, 15 percent of the total vote share and was elected to the Legislative Council. He was re-elected in 2016, with an increase of votes, 50,309 votes which counted for 15 percent of the vote share.

He contested in the Democratic Party chairmanship election in 2014. He entered in the second round with 104 votes against incumbent Emily Lau's 158 votes. He lost the second round to Lau by 145 to 171 votes. Wu ran again in the 2016 chairmanship election after Emily Lau retired from the Legislative Council and her party office. He was elected the party chairman uncontestedly, with 92 percent of the confidence vote.

On 11 November 2020, 15 democratic lawmakers including Wu resigned en masse in protest of a decision made by the central government in Beijing the same day, authorizing the Hong Kong government to dismiss politicians who were deemed to be a threat under the       
national security law promulgated in the city on 30 June 2020; the initial dismissal had concerned four democrats. Wu said that the Beijing ruling was a declaration of the "official death" of the One country, two systems principle.

Arrests
Wu was arrested on 1 November 2020, along with six other democratic councillors, in connection with a melee that broke out in the Legislative Council on 8 May 2020. On that day, Starry Lee, the incumbent chair of the House Committee of the Legislative Council, had attempted to commence a meeting of the committee after extended stalling tactics of the pan-democratic camp over the previous months.

On 8 December 2020, Wu was arrested for allegedly inciting and participating in the unauthorized 1 July march that year. Seven other democrats were arrested the same day on similar charges.

On 6 January 2021, Wu was among 53members of the pro-democratic camp who were arrested under the national security law, specifically its provision regarding subversion. The group stood accused of organizing and/or participating in unofficial primary elections held by the camp in July 2020. During the arrest, police allegedly found a BNO passport belonging to Wu, a breach of bail conditions for the illegal assembly charge, which included the surrender of all travel documents. Wu was detained at a Correctional Services facility until a hearing on 8 January at West Kowloon Court. At that hearing, Wu was found to have breached bail conditions, had his bail revoked, and was detained due to the magistrate seeing a substantial risk of Wu absconding. On 7 May 2021, High Court judge Esther Toh granted Wu an emergency bail application to attend his father's funeral, in an appeal of the Correctional Services Department's earlier refusal.

References

External links
The Democratic Party official website
Wong Tai Sin District Council

1962 births
Living people
District councillors of Wong Tai Sin District
United Democrats of Hong Kong politicians
Democratic Party (Hong Kong) politicians
Alumni of Queen's College, Hong Kong
University of Wisconsin–Milwaukee alumni
Members of the Urban Council of Hong Kong
HK LegCo Members 2012–2016
HK LegCo Members 2016–2021
Hong Kong political prisoners